The 2022 Trophée Lagardère was a professional tennis tournament played on outdoor clay courts. It was the 1st edition of the tournament and part of the 2022 WTA 125 tournaments, offering a total of $115,000 in prize money. It took place in the middle of Bois de Boulogne in Paris, France between 9 and 15 May 2022.

Singles main-draw entrants

Seeds 

 1 Rankings are as of 25 April 2022.

Other entrants 
The following players received a wildcard into the singles main draw:
  Fiona Ferro
  Linda Fruhvirtová
  Elsa Jacquemot
  Séléna Janicijevic

The following players qualified into the singles main draw:
  Delia Gaillard
  Arianne Hartono
  Marine Partaud
  Anastasia Zakharova

The following player received entry as lucky loser:
  Joanne Züger

Withdrawals 
Before the tournament
  Océane Dodin → replaced by  Hailey Baptiste
  Caroline Garcia → replaced by  Anastasia Potapova
  Ann Li → replaced by  Maddison Inglis
  Anna Karolína Schmiedlová → replaced by  Christina McHale
  Wang Qiang → replaced by  Jang Su-jeong
  Heather Watson → replaced by  Joanne Züger
  Vera Zvonareva → replaced by  Donna Vekić

Doubles entrants

Seeds 

 1 Rankings as of 25 April 2022.

Other entrants 
The following pair received a wildcard into the doubles main draw:
  Delia Gaillard /  Jang Su-jeong

Champions

Singles

  Claire Liu def.  Beatriz Haddad Maia 6–3, 6–4

Doubles

  Beatriz Haddad Maia /  Kristina Mladenovic def.  Oksana Kalashnikova /  Miyu Kato 5–7, 6–4, [10–4]

References

External links 
 Official website

2022 WTA 125 tournaments
Tennis tournaments in France
2022 in French tennis
May 2022 sports events in France